The 2014 Puskás Cup was the seventh edition of the Puskás Cup and took place between 18 April to 21 April in Felcsút, Hungary. Real Madrid were the defending champions. 

On 3 March 2014, it was announced that the final match of the 2014 Puskás Cup will be the opening match of the new Pancho Arena.  György Szöllősi, communication director of the Ferenc Puskás Football Academy, announced that there will be 4,500 spectators at the final of the 2014 Puskás Cup. Among the invited guests there will be the wife of Ferenc Puskás, the former Croatian football legend, Davor Šuker, the former German international and Hungary coach, Lothar Matthäus, former Videoton coach and Portugal international Paulo Sousa, and former Golden Team members Jenő Buzánszky and Gyula Grosics. The opening speech will be delivered by the president of the  Hungarian Olympic Committee and former Hungarian MP Pál Schmitt and the president of the Spanish Football Federation, Ángel María Villar.

Participating teams
 Budapest Honvéd (former club of Ferenc Puskás)
 Dinamo Zagreb (invited)
 Melbourne Football Institute (invited)
 Panathinaikos (former club of Ferenc Puskás)
 Puskás Akadémia (host)
 Real Madrid (former club of Ferenc Puskás)

Venues

Squads

Budapest Honvéd
Coach: András Rakonczay

Dinamo Zagreb
Coach: Jozo Bandic

Melbourne Football Institute
Coach:

Panathinaikos
Coach:

Puskás Akadémia
Coach: István Vincze

Real Madrid
Coach:

Results
All times are local (UTC+2).

Group A

Group B

Fifth place play-off

Third place play-off

Final

Goal scorers

References

External links
Official website

2010
2013–14 in Spanish football
2013–14 in Hungarian football
2013–14 in Greek football
2013–14 in Croatian football
2014 in Australian soccer